Boy's Own McBeth is a musical comedy by Grahame Bond and Jim Burnett.

It concerns Terry Shakespeare, a 42-year-old man who has been a student at Dunsinane Boys School for 36 years, deliberately failing rather than facing the outside world.

After a season at The Kirk Gallery in Sydney from July 1979, Boy's Own McBeth opened in a bigger production at the Paris Theatre in November 1979. It toured widely across Australia for two years.

A cast recording was released in 1979.

The production also played at the Westwood Playhouse in Los Angeles.

References 

Australian musicals
1979 musicals